This was the first edition of the tournament and was part of the 2022 Legión Sudamericana.

Diego Hidalgo and Cristian Rodríguez won the title after defeating Orlando Luz and Felipe Meligeni Alves 7–5, 6–1 in the final.

Seeds

Draw

References

External links
 Main draw

Salvador Challenger – Doubles
Salvador Challenger